Alniphyllum is a genus of three species of flowering plants in the family Styracaceae, native to eastern Asia, from central China south to India and Vietnam.

The species are small to medium-sized deciduous trees growing to 15–30 m tall.

Species
 Alniphyllum eberhardtii Guillaum.
 Alniphyllum fortunei (Hemsl.) Makino
 Alniphyllum pterospermum Matsum.

References

Styracaceae
Ericales genera
Taxonomy articles created by Polbot